Kristina Dovydaitytė (born 30 October 1985) is a Lithuanian badminton player. She has competed at the Deaflympics in 2001, 2005 and 2009. 

Dovydaitytė clinched a bronze medal during the 2001 Summer Deaflympics in the women's singles, which was her first Deaflympic medal. In the 2005 Summer Deaflympics, she won the women's singles which was also the only gold medal won by her in the Deaflympic career.

References

External links 
 
 

1985 births
Living people
Lithuanian female badminton players
Deaf badminton players
Lithuanian deaf people